Repatriation of Seafarers Convention (Revised), 1987 is  an International Labour Organization Convention (Number 166).

It was established in 1987, with the preamble stating:
Having decided upon the adoption of certain proposals with regard to the Revision of the Repatriation of Seamen Convention, 1926 (No. 23), and of the Repatriation (Ship Masters and Apprentices) Recommendation, 1926 (No. 27),,...

Ratifications 
As of 2023, the convention had been ratified by 14 states. Of the ratifying states, ten have subsequently denounced the treaty.

External links 
Text.
Ratifications.

International Labour Organization conventions
Treaties concluded in 1987
Treaties entered into force in 1991
Treaties of Brazil
Treaties of Egypt
Treaties of Germany
Treaties of Guyana
Treaties of the Hungarian People's Republic
Treaties of Mexico
Treaties of Romania
Treaties of Turkey
Admiralty law treaties
1987 in labor relations